Antonín Carvan (15 May 1901 – 1 November 1959) was a former Czechoslovak football midfielder. He played 14 games for the Czechoslovakia national football team.

References

1901 births
1959 deaths
Czech footballers
Czechoslovak footballers
Czechoslovakia international footballers
AC Sparta Prague players
FC Zbrojovka Brno players
FK Viktoria Žižkov players
Czech football managers
Czechoslovak football managers
FC Zbrojovka Brno managers
Czechoslovak expatriate footballers
Expatriate footballers in France
Czechoslovak expatriate sportspeople in France
FK Náchod-Deštné players
Association football midfielders
Sportspeople from Kladno